Top Secret is a 1998 French drama film directed by Jacques Rivette.

Cast
Sandrine Bonnaire as Sylvie Rousseau 
Jerzy Radziwilowicz as Walser 
Grégoire Colin as Paul, Sylvie's brother
Laure Marsac as Véronique / Ludivine 
Françoise Fabian as Geneviève, Sylvie's mother
Christine Vouilloz as Myriam

References

Further reading

External links 
 

1998 films
Films directed by Jacques Rivette
French drama films
1990s French-language films
1990s French films